Thibaut Nicolas Marc Courtois (born 11 May 1992) is a Belgian professional footballer who plays as a goalkeeper for La Liga club Real Madrid and the Belgium national team. Regarded as one of the best goalkeepers in the world, he is known for excellent reflexes, acrobatic saves, and command of the penalty area.

Courtois progressed through the youth system of Genk, and at age 18, he played a key role in the team's Belgian Pro League victory. In July 2011, he joined Chelsea for a reported £8 million, and was immediately loaned to Atlético Madrid. During his three seasons there, they won the Europa League in 2012, the Copa del Rey in 2013, and the La Liga title in 2014. He also won the Ricardo Zamora Trophy as the best goalkeeper in La Liga for his performances in his two latter seasons. Courtois returned to Chelsea in July 2014, and in his first season he helped them win the League Cup and the Premier League title. Two years later, he was awarded the Premier League Golden Glove as Chelsea again won the league. In 2018, Real Madrid signed Courtois for £35 million, becoming La Liga's most expensive goalkeeper, surpassing the record set by Jan Oblak. A second La Liga title and a third Zamora trophy would follow in 2020. In 2022 came his third La Liga title and first UEFA Champions League title.

Courtois made his senior international debut in October 2011, becoming the youngest goalkeeper to represent Belgium. He has since earned over ninety caps and appeared at the FIFA World Cup in 2014, 2018 and 2022, and the UEFA European Championship in 2016 and 2020; he was awarded the Golden Glove in 2018 as the best goalkeeper of the tournament, with Belgium finishing third.

He was named the third-best goalkeeper in the  IFFHS World's Best Goalkeeper (2011–2020), being named behind Manuel Neuer and Gianluigi Buffon.

Club career

Early career
Courtois was born in the city of Bree in Flanders, to a Walloon father and a Flemish mother. He began his career with local side Bilzen V.V., as a left back. Soon after, in 1999, he joined Racing Genk at the age of seven, and it was there that he was converted into a goalkeeper.

Genk

Courtois progressed through the Genk youth system, where Koen Casteels was initially regarded as the primary goalkeeper, but during an injury crisis Courtois, aged 16 years and 341 days, made his first team debut on 17 April 2009 against Gent. After turning down a transfer to TSG 1899 Hoffenheim of the Bundesliga, Courtois was made first-choice goalkeeper for the 2010–11 season ahead of Casteels, when Laszlo Koteles' registration ran into issues.

He was a key figure in Genk's title victory in the 2010–11 season in the Belgian Pro League. He received the Goalkeeper of the Year and Genk's Player of the Year award, only conceding 32 goals over the course of 40 league matches and keeping 14 clean sheets for Genk.

Atlético Madrid

In July 2011 Courtois joined Premier League club Chelsea for a reported €9 million, signing a five-year deal. Within weeks of joining Chelsea, Courtois was sent on a season-long loan to Atlético Madrid.

2011–12 season
Courtois made his debut for Atlético in a 4–0 UEFA Europa League victory over Vitória de Guimarães on 25 August, and three days later kept a clean sheet on his La Liga debut, a goalless draw against Osasuna at the Vicente Calderón Stadium. Courtois became first-choice goalkeeper over Sergio Asenjo, keeping four clean sheets in his first six La Liga games. On 26 November 2011, Courtois received his first red card of his professional career after fouling Real Madrid's Karim Benzema for a penalty in the Madrid derby. Cristiano Ronaldo put the penalty past substitute goalkeeper Asenjo as Atlético lost 1–4. Atlético reached the 2012 UEFA Europa League final, and Courtois kept a clean sheet as the club won 3–0 over fellow Spanish side Athletic Bilbao.

2012–13 season
Courtois' loan to Atlético was extended to cover the 2012–13 season. His first game of the loan extension was against parent club Chelsea in the 2012 UEFA Super Cup in Monaco, which ended in a 4–1 victory for Atlético Madrid. Later in the season Courtois set a new Atlético Madrid record of 820 minutes without conceding a goal at the Estadio Vicente Calderon, ended by being beaten in a 1–0 loss to Real Sociedad. Atlético reached the 2013 Copa del Rey Final, and Courtois was named man of the match in a 2–1 victory against Real, the first time that Atlético had beaten their city rivals in 14 years.

2013–14 season
For the 2013–14 season, Courtois loan to Atlético was extended by a further 12 months.

When Atlético were drawn to play Chelsea in the Champions League semi-final, it was reported that a clause in Courtois' contract required Atlético to pay Chelsea €3 million per match if they selected him against his parent club, and that Atlético could not afford such a sum. UEFA made it clear that considerations of sporting integrity made such a clause "null, void and unenforceable", and confirmed that Atlético were free to select Courtois without making any such payment.

By conceding the fewest goals in a substantial number of matches during the 2013–14 season, Courtois won the Ricardo Zamora Trophy and made an important contribution to Atletico's 2013–14 La Liga title, their first since 1996. He was nominated for the La Liga Award for the best goalkeeper in the league, alongside Willy Caballero of Málaga and Keylor Navas of Levante, which Navas eventually won. Atletico, however, lost the UEFA Champions League final 1–4 a.e.t. against neighbours Real Madrid on 24 May in Lisbon.

Chelsea

2014–15 season

In June 2014, Chelsea manager José Mourinho confirmed that Courtois would return to Chelsea for the upcoming season. He was assigned the number 13 kit number, last worn by Victor Moses. On 18 August, Mourinho announced that Courtois would start the Premier League opener against Burnley in place of Petr Čech. Although he conceded the first goal to Scott Arfield at Turf Moor, Chelsea won 3–1. Courtois kept his first Premier League clean sheet in his second game, making several crucial saves in a 2–0 home win over Leicester City.

On 11 September 2014, Courtois signed a new five-year contract with Chelsea, keeping him at the club until 2019. Upon signing Courtois said: "It’s really nice to have signed this new contract for five years."

Courtois suffered a head injury in the first half of Chelsea's 2–0 home win over Arsenal on 5 October due to a collision with Alexis Sánchez; he was substituted and then taken to hospital. He was then treated for a minor cut to his ear and released from hospital that night.

He won his first trophy with Chelsea on 1 March 2015, as they defeated Tottenham Hotspur 2–0 in the League Cup final, with Čech instead playing in that match; Chelsea also finished the season as league champions.

2015–16 season

Courtois opened the season by playing in the 2015 FA Community Shield on 2 August, a 1–0 loss to Arsenal. Six days later, as the Premier League campaign opened with a home fixture against Swansea City, he was given a straight red card for conceding a penalty with a foul on Bafétimbi Gomis, who converted the penalty past replacement Asmir Begović for a 2–2 draw. On his return on 23 August, Courtois saved a penalty from James Morrison in a 3–2 win at West Bromwich Albion. Courtois suffered a leg injury in training on 11 September which required surgery and meant that he was expected to miss the next three months of competition.

On 16 April, he was sent off at home to Manchester City for conceding a penalty with a foul on Fernandinho; Sergio Agüero converted it past Begović to seal a 3–0 win. He became the sixth Premier League goalkeeper to be sent off twice in the same season.

2016–17 season
On 17 August 2016, Courtois dismissed any transfer rumours and stated he would stay at Chelsea for many years to come. Ten days later in the 3–0 home victory over Burnley, Courtois kept the first clean sheet of the season and broke a run of thirteen home Premier League games without a clean sheet since November 2015. From 1 October to 20 November, Chelsea earned a run of six games without conceding a single goal; with Courtois playing in all six of them. From 11 to 26 December, Courtois kept four clean sheets, as Chelsea were at the top of table in time for Christmas.

In April 2017, Courtois was ruled out for the match against rivals Manchester United, as a result of suffering a reported ankle injury, which he sustained in training. Chelsea would go on to lose the match 0–2. On 12 May 2017, Courtois kept his third consecutive clean sheet in a 1–0 away win over West Bromwich Albion, in which Chelsea secured the title. Courtois also played for Chelsea in the FA Cup final; which Chelsea lost 2–1 to Arsenal.

Courtois kept a total of 16 clean sheets in the Premier League and won the Golden Glove.

Real Madrid

Following the 2017–18 season, Courtois mentioned he would want to live closer to his children, reigniting the rumours about a transfer to Real Madrid. After a strong performance at the 2018 FIFA World Cup, where he won the Golden Glove for best goalkeeper, Courtois expressed his interest in moving on. Chelsea stated they would not let him go unless they were able to find a replacement for him. Courtois responded by not showing up for training after the summer break, trying to force his exit from Chelsea. On 8 August 2018, Real Madrid announced that they had signed Courtois on a six-year contract. A day later, Chelsea confirmed the transfer for a fee believed to be £35 million.

He made his debut for Madrid on 1 September 2018, where he started in a 4–1 win over Leganés.

On 12 January 2020, Real Madrid beat Courtois' former club Atlético Madrid in a penalty shootout to win their eleventh Supercopa de España title. In the shootout, Saul saw his spot-kick hit the post before Thomas' effort was saved by Courtois, giving Ramos the chance to secure Real's 11th Spanish Super Cup triumph.

On 5 July 2020, Courtois kept his 17th clean sheet of the 2019–20 La Liga season in a 1–0 away win over Athletic Bilbao, becoming the first Real Madrid goalkeeper to do so in a single season since Francisco Buyo in 1994–95. He was the undisputed starter during the league season, as Real Madrid won the La Liga, becoming the first player since José Luis Pérez-Payá in 1954 to be crowned champion with both Real Madrid and Atlético Madrid. He won the Zamora Trophy for the third time in his career, after conceding just 20 goals in 34 matches.

On 16 August 2021, he signed a new four-year contract, running until 2026. On 6 February 2022, he reached his 100th win with Real Madrid in 161 appearances, in a 1–0 victory over Granada. Courtois won his second Spanish title with Real Madrid in the 2021–22 La Liga season.

On 28 May 2022, Courtois was named man of the match in the 2022 UEFA Champions League final, where he managed to make a total of nine saves, which helped Real Madrid to beat Liverpool 1–0. Courtois' nine saves are a record in the final since Opta began keeping records in 2003–04. His 59 saves during the campaign also set a new Champions League single-season record since Opta began keeping records.

International career

Early career
Courtois was first called up to the Belgium squad in October 2011 and made his debut the following month in a friendly 0–0 draw against France at the Stade de France, making him the youngest goalkeeper to play for the Belgian national team.

2014 World Cup
Courtois played every minute during the 2014 FIFA World Cup qualification campaign, as Belgium qualified for its first major tournament since the 2002 FIFA World Cup. Throughout these qualifiers, he kept six clean sheets in ten matches.

On 13 May 2014, Courtois was named in the squad to go to the 2014 FIFA World Cup. At the tournament, he played all five games of the Belgian team, starting with a 2–1 win against Algeria in Belo Horizonte. Courtois then managed to keep consecutive clean sheets in 1–0 wins against Russia and South Korea as the Red Devils reached the quarter-finals.

Euro 2016
Courtois played every minute during Belgium's first eight games of their UEFA Euro 2016 qualification campaign, helping seal qualification for the first time in 16 years. However, he missed their last two games due to injury.

Courtois and his side made it to the quarter-final, where they lost to Wales despite taking an early lead. Afterwards, Courtois hinted that Belgium coach Marc Wilmots was at fault for the loss and also stated that the defeat was the "biggest disappointment" of his career.

2018 World Cup

Courtois was selected to Belgium's final 23-man squad for the 2018 FIFA World Cup. He was Belgium's first-choice goalkeeper throughout the tournament, and played a key role in Belgium's 2–1 win over Brazil in the quarter-final, which saw Belgium advance to the semi-finals of the tournament for the first time since 1986. He posted two clean sheets in the group stage (against Panama and England), allowed only one goal in Belgium's loss to eventual champion France in the semi-final, and posted another clean sheet against England in the 3rd place game. Courtois made 27 saves in seven World Cup games, more than any other goalkeeper. He was awarded the Golden Glove as best goalkeeper of the tournament.

UEFA Euro 2020
On 17 May 2021, he was selected to the final squad for the UEFA Euro 2020.

2022 World Cup
In November 2022, he was named in the final squad for the 2022 FIFA World Cup in Qatar. On 1 December, he played his 100th match for Belgium in a goalless draw against Croatia, becoming the first Belgian goalkeeper to achieve this feat.

Style of play

Considered a highly promising prospect in his youth, Courtois subsequently established himself as one of the best players in the world in his position. Due to his wide range of skills, he has been described as a "complete goalkeeper", with few weaknesses. A consistent keeper, he possesses an excellent positional sense, good mentality, composure, strength of character, and an ability to communicate well with his defenders; he also excels in one on one situations, due to his ability to time his runs effectively when rushing out of goal to face opponents, and has even functioned as a sweeper-keeper on occasion. An excellent shot-stopper between the posts, he has also distinguished himself for his agility and quick reflexes, in spite of his size and imposing physique. During the 2016–17 season, he credited his goalkeeping coach with Chelsea under manager Antonio Conte, Gianluca Spinelli, for helping him to improve his overall game and goalkeeping technique, in particular his foot-work and diving, which enabled him to be more explosive and get to ground more quickly. Due to his height and reach, he excels in the air, and is also known for his command of his area, as well as his excellent technique, anticipation, handling, and confidence when coming off his line to claim crosses. Moreover, he is known for his ability to distribute the ball to his teammates with long throws.

Outside football

Personal life
Courtois speaks both Dutch and French, as well as Spanish and English. Thibaut's older sister Valérie Courtois is a volleyball player who plays as a libero for Stade Français Paris Saint Cloud and Belgium. His parents were volleyball players, and he played the sport in his childhood but decided to focus on football when he was 12.

On 26 May 2015, his Spanish girlfriend Marta Domínguez gave birth to their daughter, Adriana. The couple ended their relationship in April 2017 while Domínguez was pregnant with their son Nicolás, who was born a month later.

He has been in a relationship with Israeli model Mishel Gerzig since July 2021. They adopted a dog together a month later. In June 2022, they got engaged.

In popular culture
Inspired by Courtois' pose from a particular save in January 2013, a Colombian fan created a new widespread social media meme called 'Thibauting' to pay homage to the Belgian goalkeeper. In November 2013, the word was included in a shortlist composed by leading Dutch dictionary Van Dale to be polled to determine the best new sports/amusement word of the year in Belgium, and ended second. The term is based on and pronounced the same way as "Tebowing", and is also similar to the worldwide 'planking' meme which was popular in 2011.

In 2021, Courtois participated in the 2021 F1 Virtual Grand Prix championship as an Alfa Romeo driver.

Controversies
In February 2014, Courtois caused some stir in the national team, by saying of Simon Mignolet, his rival for the starting goalkeeper spot, "You have to know how to stay humble and respectful, and he should remember that." This was despite the fact that in previous interviews, Mignolet had only said that it was his ambition to keep working and try to regain his spot in the national team.

In April 2018, Wilmots, by then out of a job, accused Courtois and his father Thierry of leaking Belgium's line-ups before they should have been revealed to the public. He denied the allegations.

Career statistics

Club

International

Honours

Genk
Belgian Pro League: 2010–11

Atlético Madrid
La Liga: 2013–14
Copa del Rey: 2012–13
UEFA Europa League: 2011–12
UEFA Super Cup: 2012
UEFA Champions League runner-up: 2013–14

Chelsea
Premier League: 2014–15, 2016–17
FA Cup: 2017–18; runner-up: 2016–17
Football League Cup: 2014–15

Real Madrid
La Liga: 2019–20, 2021–22
Supercopa de España: 2019–20, 2021–22
UEFA Champions League: 2021–22
UEFA Super Cup: 2022
FIFA Club World Cup: 2018

Belgium
FIFA World Cup third place: 2018

Individual

Belgian Professional Goalkeeper of the Year: 2011
Belgian Bronze Shoe: 2011
La Liga Zamora Trophy: 2012–13, 2013–14, 2019–20
La Liga Goalkeeper of the Season: 2012–13
La Liga Player of the Month: January 2020, February 2022
Best Belgian Player Abroad: 2013, 2014
ESM Team of the Year: 2013–14, 2021–22
UEFA Champions League Squad of the Season: 2013–14, 2020–21
UEFA Champions League Team of the Season: 2021–22
Belgian Sportsman of the year: 2014
Premier League Golden Glove: 2016–17
 FIFA World Cup Golden Glove: 2018
FIFA World Cup Fantasy Team: 2018
FIFA World Cup Dream Team: 2018
The Best FIFA Goalkeeper: 2018
IFFHS World's Best Goalkeeper: 2018, 2022
IFFHS Men's World Team: 2018, 2022
La Liga Team of the Season: 2021–22
Yashin Trophy: 2022
FIFA FIFPRO World 11: 2022

See also
 List of men's footballers with 100 or more international caps

References

External links

Real Madrid profile

1992 births
Living people
People from Bree, Belgium
Footballers from Limburg (Belgium)
Belgian footballers
Association football goalkeepers
K.R.C. Genk players
Chelsea F.C. players
Atlético Madrid footballers
Real Madrid CF players
Belgian Pro League players
La Liga players
Premier League players
FA Cup Final players
UEFA Champions League winning players
UEFA Europa League winning players
Belgium youth international footballers
Belgium international footballers
2014 FIFA World Cup players
UEFA Euro 2016 players
2018 FIFA World Cup players
UEFA Euro 2020 players
2022 FIFA World Cup players
Belgian expatriate footballers
Expatriate footballers in England
Expatriate footballers in Spain
Belgian expatriate sportspeople in England
Belgian expatriate sportspeople in Spain
FIFA Century Club